Vermand is a commune in the Aisne department in Hauts-de-France in northern France.

Vermand was probably the original capital of the Viromandui, after whom the region of Vermandois is named. It was later displaced by the Roman settlement of Augusta Viromanduorum, modern Saint-Quentin.

Population

See also
Communes of the Aisne department

References

Communes of Aisne
Aisne communes articles needing translation from French Wikipedia
Viromandui